Fatmir Mediu (born 21 January 1967, in Durrës) is an Albanian conservative politician.  He is the current Chairman of the Republican Party of Albania, and served as Minister of Defence from September 2005 to March 2008, and Minister of Environment, Forests & Water Administration.

In March 2008, Mediu resigned from his position as Defence Minister following a military ammunition explosion in Gërdec, a village outside of the capital of Albania. The explosion killed 26 people, injured hundreds, and damaged or destroyed over two thousand homes. He was succeeded by Gazmend Oketa.

While Minister of Environment, he quietly oversaw the 2010 Albania floods in the Northern regions of the country, largely caused by poor forest management practices, illegal logging, and heavy rains.

Sources

External links

1967 births
Living people
Albanian politicians
People from Durrës
Government ministers of Albania
Defence ministers of Albania
Environment ministers of Albania
Political party leaders of Albania
21st-century Albanian politicians
Albanian republicans